Kevin Anderson (born January 13, 1960) is an American stage and film actor. He is also a singer and drummer.

Early life 
Anderson was born on January 13, 1960, in Gurnee, Illinois, the son of Joseph Anderson. He is one of five children. He studied acting in the Goodman School of Drama at DePaul University in Chicago, for three years.

Film and television career 
Anderson is perhaps most known for his role as a priest on the television series Nothing Sacred (1997), about a priest with self-doubts. He was nominated for a Golden Globe for this role.

One of his first major film roles was as the brother of Richard Gere's character in the 1988 film Miles from Home. He also starred in the 1991 film Sleeping with the Enemy with Julia Roberts. He appeared in the 2006 version of Charlotte's Web as Mr. Arable. This was the second time he worked with Julia Roberts, who voiced the role of Charlotte.

Theater career 
He is a member of the Steppenwolf Theatre Company, which has also featured John Malkovich, Gary Sinise and Laurie Metcalf. He has won a Theatre World Award and Joseph Jefferson Award for his performance in Lyle Kessler's play Orphans (he later reappeared in the role for the 1987 film).

In 1993, Anderson created the role of Joe Gillis in the original London production of Andrew Lloyd Webber's Sunset Boulevard opposite Patti LuPone who originated the role of Norma Desmond. LuPone was not given the role in the musical in New York, and the situation became a "very nasty, public affair. 'I was caught in the middle of all that,' Anderson said. LuPone went public with her rage; her co-star quietly took himself out of the loop... 'I fired everybody and jumped on my motorcycle.' "

Anderson won the 1999 Drama Desk Award for Outstanding Featured Actor in a Play and was nominated for a Tony Award for his role in the revival of Death of a Salesman.

He appeared on Broadway in the Manhattan Theatre Club production of Come Back, Little Sheba as Doc from January 24, 2008, to March 16, 2008. Anderson starred as Andy Dufresne in the stage version of the film The Shawshank Redemption which premiered at the Gaiety Theatre, Dublin in May 2009. The play transferred to the West End at the Wyndham's Theatre in London, from September 4, 2009, to November 29, 2009.

He appeared in A Guide for the Perplexed at the Victory Gardens Theater, Chicago in July–August 2010.

Personal life 
Anderson embarked on a cross-country motorcycle trip and was struck by a car in 1994; which put him out of work for a year. In the accident he suffered a broken leg and broken arm and other health complications (including an embolism).

It took him a couple of years to rehabilitate, but he describes the years as one of the best times in his life because it forced him to look at his motives and his life.

Filmography

Film

Television

References

External links 

Internet Broadway Database

1960 births
Living people
20th-century American male actors
21st-century American male actors
American male film actors
American male stage actors
American male television actors
DePaul University alumni
Drama Desk Award winners
Male actors from Illinois
Male actors from Malibu, California
People from Gurnee, Illinois
Steppenwolf Theatre Company players